Degassed water is water subjected to a process of degassing, which essentially consists in the removal of gas dissolved in the liquid.

External links 
Nature publication by Philip Ball
Journal of Physical Chemistry C publication 

Gas-liquid separation